Leuville-sur-Orge (literally Leuville on Orge) is a commune  south of Paris, France. It is situated in the Essonne department in the Île-de-France region.

Inhabitants of Leuville-sur-Orge are known as Leuvillois.

Geography
Neighbouring towns: Linas, Longpont-sur-Orge, Brétigny-sur-Orge, and Saint-Germain-lès-Arpajon. It is served by the RN20 and A104 motorways.

History
In the Middle Ages, Leuville-sur-Orge belonged to the fiefdom of Montlhéry. The Leuvillois took part in feudal wars on behalf of the fiefdom of Montlhéry and the abbey of Longpont. During the famous battle of Montlhéry (13 July 1465) between Louis XI and Charles le Téméraire, the population of Leuville (approximately 50) was halved.

During the 16th century the village belonged to the Olivier de Leuville family who built a castle. The castle now no longer exists nor do any remains. The castle (that can be seen today) of Leuville dates back to the 18th century.

During the French revolution (1789–1799), Leuville served as a refuge for Lacépède, protégé of Buffon and a knowledgeable botanist, whilst fleeing the reign of terror in Paris.

More recently in 1922, it was a refuge of the then exiled Georgian leader Noe Zhordania and his government-in-exile who settled there. The 4.5 ha estate where the Georgian government was located was handed over to Georgia by France in 2016.

Leuville used to be a farming community which supplied Paris with agricultural produce. This was helped by its location on the «Voie Royale», a major road connecting Orléans and Paris which gave easy access to the nation's capital. Produce was originally transported by foot, then by cart, and eventually by train, thanks to the famous Arpajonnais railroad. The main agricultural produce of the town were potatoes, pumpkins and wine.

Twin towns
 Mtskheta, Georgia, 2001

See also
Leuville Cemetery
Georgian-French day of Leuville-sur-Orge
Communes of the Essonne department

References

External links

 Official town website 

Mayors of Essonne Association 

Communes of Essonne